The Glendale Elementary School District is the elementary school district for Glendale, Arizona. It operates 17 schools in grades K-8 and serves about 13,000 students.

References

External links

School districts in Arizona
School districts in Maricopa County, Arizona